Edward Davis Townsend (August 22, 1817 – May 10, 1893) was Adjutant General of the United States Army from 1869 to 1880.

The son of David S. & Eliza (Gerry) Townsend and grandson of Vice President Elbridge Gerry, Townsend was educated at Boston's Latin School before graduating from the United States Military Academy in 1837. He was commissioned a second lieutenant in the Second U. S. Artillery and served as that regiment's adjutant and participating in the Second Seminole War and the relocation of the Cherokee Nation. In 1846 he was transferred to the Adjutant General's Corps and assigned to duty in Washington, D.C. He served on the Pacific coast from 1851 to 1856, after which he returned to Washington for the remainder of his career. In February 1869 he was promoted to brigadier general and became adjutant general. Townsend retired in 1880. He died in Washington in 1893 after an accidental shock from a cable car and is buried at Rock Creek Cemetery in Washington, D.C.

See also

List of Adjutant Generals of the U.S. Army
List of Massachusetts generals in the American Civil War

References

Further reading

External links

1817 births
1893 deaths
Accidental deaths by electrocution
Adjutants general of the United States Army
Boston Latin School alumni
Burials at Rock Creek Cemetery
People from Boston
People of Massachusetts in the American Civil War
American people of the Seminole Wars
United States Army generals
United States Military Academy alumni
Union Army colonels